The 2017–18 LNBP season was the 18th season of the Liga Nacional de Baloncesto Profesional (LNBP). The regular season began on 20 October 2017 and ended on 2 March 2018. The playoffs began on 6 March and ended on 10 April 2018.

Teams

Changes from last season
The league expanded to 11 teams for the 2017–18 season with the additions of the Aguacateros de Michoacán, Capitanes de Ciudad de México and Libertadores de Querétaro.

During the offseason, the Barreteros de Zacatecas were renamed the Mineros de Zacatecas. Garzas de Plata UAEH left the league and Indios de Ciudad Juárez  announced they were sitting out the current season.

Venues and locations

</onlyinclude>

Regular season

Standings

Playoffs
* – Denotes overtime period

All-Star Weekend

The 2017 LNBP All-Star Game was an exhibition basketball game that was played on December 3, 2017 in León, Guanajuato at the Domo de la Feria, home of the Abejas de Guanajuato. It was the 20th edition of the event. The Mexicans won the game 163-136. The MVP of the game was Juan Toscano-Anderson, who scored 7 assists, the most ever scored by a player in an All-Star Game.

Location

There was a lot of speculation over the location of the game. Finally on October 12, Sergio Ganem, the league commissioner announced on a press conference that the chosen location was the Domo de la Feria in León, stating that the region deserved it because of its loyal fans.
The commissioner of the LNBP, Sergio Ganem, considered that the All-Star Game will be a great event in a city like León, where basketball is important and in previous editions it had pronounced itself for being the venue. "It is a place that had already demanded in previous years through its president Alejandro Marcocchio the All-Star Game and I think it is a very wise decision to bring to León and Bajío the best basketball in Mexico," he said.

All-Star Game

Coaches
With the best record at the time, and also as an assistant coach in the National Team, Spaniard Ramón Díaz was selected as the coach for the Mexicans. The coach with the second best record, Iván Déniz, also Spanish, was selected as a coach for the foreigners.

Roster
Each roster is selected by a voting process which occurs on social networking sites, such as Twitter, or Facebook, and players selected by the coach of each side, and is composed of 14 players for each team. The Mexicans were led by Lorenzo Mata, Juan Toscano-Anderson, Pedro Meza, Edgar Garibay, and Israel Gutierrez, which were selected to be in the starting lineup. Toscano would end up being the game's MVP for a 2nd consecutive year.

Meanwhile, the foreigners were led by their starters who were: Dominicans Juan Coronado, and Emmanuel Ándujar, Puerto Rican Jonathan Rodríguez, and Americans Reggie Larry and Eugene Phelps.

Mexico's reserves included Fernando Benítez, Raúl Bórquez, Cezar Guerrero, P. J. Reyes, Irwin Ávalos, Ray Barreno, Michael Lizárraga, Roberto Nelson, Jaron Martín.

Three Point Contest and Slam Dunk Contest 
The American Steven Pledger of the Abejas de León won the contest of Shots of 3, when prevailing to the Puerto Rican Isaac Sosa of the Panteras de Aguascalientes in the final round. While Juan Toscano-Anderson of Fuerza Regia de Monterrey won the contest of Clavadas, defeating in the last round the American Terrance King of the Abejas de León.

Game

References

External links

LNBP seasons
LNBP